Tilwa is a Village of Ghazipur District located in Uttar Pradesh, India.

References 

Villages in Ghazipur district